Mandy Simons is a linguist and professor in the Department of Philosophy at Carnegie Mellon University (CMU). She researches semantics and pragmatics, in particular phenomena like presupposition and projection.

Biography

Simons earned her PhD in linguistics at Cornell in 1998 with a dissertation entitled, "Or: Issues in the Semantics and Pragmatics of Disjunction." She joined the faculty at CMU in 1998, and also holds an adjunct position at the University of Pittsburgh's Department of Linguistics.

Awards 

In 2013, her paper, "Toward a taxonomy of projective content," coauthored with Judith Tonhauser, David Beaver, and Craige Roberts won the 2013 Best Paper in Language (journal) Award from the Linguistic Society of America.

Selected publications

References

Living people
Linguists from the United States
Women linguists
Semanticists
Cornell University alumni
Carnegie Mellon University faculty
Year of birth missing (living people)